Guido Rancez (born 30 April 1990) is an Argentine professional footballer who plays as a midfielder for Italian club US Ghilarza Calcio.

Career
Rancez played for Unión Santa Fe's youth, before appearing at senior level with Colón de San Justo and Santa Fe Fútbol Club. He joined Villa San Carlos in 2012, making his professional debut in a Primera B Metropolitana draw with Brown on 5 August. Towards the end of the 2012–13 Primera B Metropolitana season, which ended with promotion as champions to Primera B Nacional, Rancez scored the first two goals of his career in games against Almagro and Central Córdoba. He then featured seventeen more times for Villa San Carlos. On 30 June 2014, Rancez was signed by Torneo Federal B's Alianza Coronel Moldes.

After three goals in thirteen fixtures in the fourth tier, Rancez joined Atlético Paraná of Primera B Nacional. He netted his first goal for them in his first appearance, scoring in a 3–2 loss away to Estudinates on 29 March 2015. In total, Rancez remained with the club for three seasons; featuring in forty-three fixtures whilst getting two goals, the last of which came against Santamarina in 2016–17 which saw relegation to Primera B Metropolitana confirmed. Rancez spent the entirety of 2017–18 in Torneo Federal A with Ferro Carril Oeste. Twenty-four appearances followed. A move to Santamarina was completed on 30 June 2018.

In August 2021, Rancez moved abroad and joined Italian Eccellenza side US Ghilarza Calcio.

Career statistics
.

Honours
Villa San Carlos
Primera B Metropolitana: 2012–13

References

External links

1990 births
Living people
Argentine footballers
Argentine expatriate footballers
People from San Justo Department, Santa Fe
Association football midfielders
Primera B Metropolitana players
Primera Nacional players
Torneo Federal A players
Club Atlético Villa San Carlos footballers
Club Atlético Paraná players
Club y Biblioteca Ramón Santamarina footballers
Chaco For Ever footballers
Sportspeople from Santa Fe Province
Argentine expatriate sportspeople in Italy
Expatriate footballers in Italy